Habibollah Akhlaghi (born August 3, 1985 in Andimeshk) is an Iranian wrestler. He is Ph.D. student of Sports Management in Shahid Chamran University of Ahvaz.

References
 Profile at FILA Wrestling Database

1985 births
Living people
Iranian male sport wrestlers
People from Andimeshk
Olympic wrestlers of Iran
Wrestlers at the 2012 Summer Olympics
Wrestlers at the 2016 Summer Olympics
Asian Games gold medalists for Iran
Asian Games medalists in wrestling
Wrestlers at the 2014 Asian Games
World Wrestling Championships medalists
Medalists at the 2014 Asian Games
Sportspeople from Khuzestan province
21st-century Iranian people